Hello Trouble is a 1918 American silent comedy film featuring Oliver Hardy. Like many American films of the time, Hello Trouble was subject to cuts by city and state film censorship boards. For example, the Chicago Board of Censors required a cut, in Reel 2, of eight scenes with a couple in a sliding bed.

Cast
 Oliver Hardy as A devoted husband (credited as Babe Hardy)
 Peggy Prevost as His devoted wife
 Billy Armstrong as A romantic husband
 Bartine Burkett as His devoted wife
 Charles Inslee as A dishonest undertaker
 Fay Holderness as A foxy spinster
 Charley Chase

See also
 List of American films of 1918
 Oliver Hardy filmography

References

External links

1918 films
1918 short films
American silent short films
American black-and-white films
1918 comedy films
Silent American comedy films
American comedy short films
Censored films
1910s American films